Lancashire Luck is a 1937 British comedy film directed by Henry Cass. It is notable as the film debut of Wendy Hiller, and the first credited appearance of Nigel Stock.

Plot
The film is set around the paterfamilia of the Lovejoy family in Lancashire winning a large sum on the pools. With this windfall he buys a small tea-shop in a more upper-class section of their town, and generally lives the high life. His daughter falls in love with an aristocratic visitor to the shop but her mother stands in her way until all is happily resolved by the end.

Cast
George Carney - George Lovejoy
Margaret Damer - Lady Maydew
George Galleon - Sir George Maydew
Muriel George - Mrs. Lovejoy
Wendy Hiller - Betty Lovejoy
Bett Huth - Lady Evelyn Brenton
Peter Popp
Nigel Stock - Joe Lovejoy

References

External links 
 
 

1937 films
1937 comedy films
British comedy films
British black-and-white films
Films shot at Pinewood Studios
Films directed by Henry Cass
Films produced by Anthony Havelock-Allan
British and Dominions Studios films
1930s English-language films
1930s British films